Monika Katarzyna Maciejewska-Banit (born 22 May 1970) is a Polish fencer. She competed in the women's individual and team foil events at the 1992 Summer Olympics.

References

External links
 

1970 births
Living people
Polish female fencers
Olympic fencers of Poland
Fencers at the 1992 Summer Olympics
Fencers from Warsaw